Rugby sevens at the 2011 Pan American Games was held in Guadalajara from October 29 to October 30 at the Tlaquepaque Stadium. This was the first appearance for rugby sevens at the Pan American Games. The sport is one of two sports being contested just by men, the other being baseball.

Medal summary

Medal table

Medalists

Qualification
The top 5 ranked teams qualified automatically, along with hosts Mexico and the winners of the North American and South American sevens competition.

Venue
The rugby sevens competition will be held at the newly built Tlaquepaque Stadium. The stadium can hold about 1,300 people.

Preliminary round
All times are Central Daylight Time (UTC-5)

Group A

Group B

Elimination stage

Quarterfinals

Fifth to eighth place

Seventh place match

Fifth place match

Semifinals

Bronze medal match

Gold medal match

Final standings

See also
 Rugby sevens at the Pan American Games

References

 
Rugby sevens
2011 in North American rugby union
2011 in South American rugby union
International rugby union competitions hosted by Mexico
2011 rugby sevens competitions
2011